Eriauchenus lukemacaulayi is a species of spider in the family Archaeidae. It is endemic to Madagascar.

Taxonomy 
The holotype was collected by Hannah Wood in the Parc National Andrigitra. The specific name is to honor Dr. Luke Macaulay. The genus name has also been incorrectly spelt "Eriauchenius".

Habitat and distribution 
The spider is found primarily in rainforests.

References 

Archaeidae
Spiders described in 2018